Melbourne International Arts Festival, formerly Spoleto Festival Melbourne – Festival of the Three Worlds, then Melbourne International Festival of the Arts, becoming commonly known as Melbourne Festival,  was a major international arts festival held in Melbourne, Australia, from 1986 to 2019. It was to be superseded by a new festival called  Rising from 2020 (which was subsequently derailed by the COVID-19 pandemic in Australia).

History

Names
Spoleto Melbourne – Festival of the Three Worlds, under the direction of composer Gian Carlo Menotti, was established in 1986 by the Cain government, as a sister festival of the Festival dei Due Mondi in Spoleto and the Spoleto Festival USA held in Charleston, South Carolina. The festival changed its name to the Melbourne International Festival of the Arts in 1990. It then became known as Melbourne International Arts Festival from 2003, becoming commonly known as Melbourne Festival.

The Festival was later renamed Melbourne International Arts Festival, which it retained until 2019.

Directors
It has had a number of high-profile artistic directors, including Clifford Hocking, Leo Schofield, Robyn Archer, Richard Wherrett, Jonathan Mills and Kristy Edmunds.

The artistic director for the 2009–2012 festivals was Brett Sheehy. Previously, Sheehy was artistic director of the Adelaide Festival of Arts (2006–2008), and Festival Director and Chief executive of Sydney Festival (2002–2005).

In January 2012, Melbourne Festival announced the appointment of Josephine Ridge as creative director for the 2013 festival and beyond. Prior to her appointment Josephine was general manager, then executive director and co-CEO with four artistic directors at Sydney Festival. Josephine appointed several high-profile arts workers to her creative team, including Louise Neri (Creative Associate – Visual Arts) and Richard Tognetti (Creative Associate – Music).

Selected productions
The 2006 Melbourne Festival hosted a production of Ngapartji Ngapartji, with much of the dialogue in the Pitjantjatjara language.

It premiered the universally critically acclaimed productions from The Black Arm Band, murundak in 2006, Hidden Republic in 2008 and dirtsong in 2009.

In 2015 the Australian Art Orchestra debuted Water Pushes Sand at the Festival. The piece merged Australian and Sichuanese folk musical styles and featured Zheng Sheng Li, a Sichuan Cheng Du "face changing" dancer.

In 2019 it was announced that in 2020, the festival would be transformed into Rising, to be held in the winter over several weeks. The new festival would combine the Melbourne International Arts Festival with White Night Melbourne Reimagined.

Description
Melbourne Festival was one of the most significant festivals in Australia, together with the Sydney Festival and the Adelaide Festival of Arts. It hosted performances by established artistic companies as well as independent acts.  It was an important event on the Australian cultural calendar. Each festival invited a range of dance, theatre, music, visual arts, multimedia and outdoor events from renowned and upcoming Australian and international companies and artists to Melbourne. It offered a wide variety of free family-friendly events.

It took place over 17 days each October.

Artistic directors

See also

 Melbourne International Comedy Festival
 Melbourne Fringe Festival
 Melbourne International Film Festival
 Melbourne Writers Festival
 Moomba
 Next Wave Festival
 Sydney Festival
 Perth International Arts Festival
 Brisbane Festival
 Adelaide Festival
 Ten Days on the Island

References

Festivals in Melbourne
1986 establishments in Australia
Classical music festivals in Australia
Music festivals established in 1986
Performing arts in Melbourne
Music festivals in Melbourne